Aulus Manlius Vulso was a Roman politician in the 5th century BC, and was a member of the first college of the decemviri in 451 BC. In 474 BC, he may have been elected consul with Lucius Furius Medullinus. Whether or not the decemvir is the same man as the consul of 474 BC remains unknown.

Family
He was the son of a Gnaeus Manlius, perhaps Gnaeus Manlius Cincinnatus (consul in 480 BC), and grandson of a Publius Manlius. His complete name is A. Manlius Cn.f. P.n. Vulso. He had a son by the name of Aulus Manlius Vulso Capitolinus, who was consular tribune in 405, 402, and 397 BC.

Biography
In 454 BC, under pressure by the tribunes of the plebs, the patricians accepted sending a delegation of three former consuls, among which was Vulso, Spurius Postumius Albus Regillensis, and Servius Sulpicius Camerinus Cornutus, to Athens and Magna Graecia so that they could study Greek law. They returned in 452 BC and their report resulted in the creation of the First Decemvirate (decemviri legibus scribendis) in 451 BC. Vulso actively worked alongside the decemviri, where he participated in the creation of the first written Roman laws. After about a year, he abdicated from his position with his colleagues, making way for the Second Decemvirate, which finished the last two tables of the Law of the Twelve Tables.

References

Bibliography

Ancient bibliography
 Livy, Ab urbe condita
 Dionysius of Halicarnassus, Roman Antiquities
 Diodorus Siculus, Bibliotheca Historica

Modern bibliography
 
 
 

5th-century BC Roman consuls
Ancient Roman decemvirs
Vulso, Aulus